Magic Concert (Spanish: Concierto mágico) is a 1953 Spanish musical film directed by Rafael J. Salvia and starring José María Rodero and Mercedes Monterrey.

Synopsis 
The musician Andrés Vidal composes a concert that seems to provoke a series of tragedies, until he meets Felisa, the goddaughter of his uncle Antonio de el.

Cast
 José Calvo 
 Rafael Luis Calvo 
 Joan Capri
 Ramón de Larrocha 
 Fortunato García 
 Luis Induni 
 Juan Monfort
 Mercedes Monterrey 
 Consuelo de Nieva 
 Antonio Picazo 
 Juan Pich Santasusana 
 Leopoldo Querol 
 Elvira Quintillá 
 José María Rodero

References

Bibliography 
 Francesc Llinàs. Directores de fotografía del cine español. Filmoteca Española, 1989.

External links 
 

1953 musical films
Spanish musical films
1953 films
1950s Spanish-language films
Films directed by Rafael J. Salvia
Films with screenplays by Rafael J. Salvia
Spanish black-and-white films
1950s Spanish films